General elections were held in the Federation of Malaya on Wednesday, 27 July 1955, the only general election before independence in 1957. They were held to elect members of the Federal Legislative Council, whose members had previously been fully appointed by the British High Commissioner. Voting took place in all 52 federal constituencies, each electing one member. State elections also took place in all 136 state constituencies in nine states of Malaya and two settlements from 10 October 1954 to 12 November 1955, each electing one councillor to the State Council or Settlement Council.

The Pan-Malayan Islamic Party (PMIP) was formed primarily to contest in the 1955 elections. Previously the PMIP had been known as the "Pan-Malayan Islamic Association", as a part of the United Malays National Organisation (UMNO). PMIP won support by proclaiming its aim of making Islam the base of the Malay society in the north of Malay Peninsula, which was facing the lowest economic growth in Malaya.

The elections resulted in a decisive win for the Alliance Party, an alliance of the UMNO, the Malayan Chinese Association (MCA) and Malayan Indian Congress (MIC), and a resounding defeat for Parti Negara, led by former UMNO president Onn Jaafar. Onn himself failed to win a seat, while the Alliance proceeded to form the new government, with its leader Tunku Abdul Rahman becoming Chief Minister.

Thirty Alliance candidates had majorities of over 10,000 votes. Nine of them had majorities of over 20,000. Forty-three of their opponents lost their deposits.

Timelines

Federal Legislative Council
Nomination Date : 15 June 1955
Election day : 27 July 1955

State Council

Settlement Council

Results

The Alliance Party won around 80% of the total vote and 51 out of 52 seats contested. PMIP won their only seat in Krian, Perak. Its sole winning candidate, Haji Ahmad Tuan Hussein, an Islamic scholar, was subsequently nicknamed "Mr. Opposition". Voter turnout was 82.8%.

Results by state

Johore

Kedah

Kelantan

Malacca

Negri Sembilan

Pahang

Penang

Perak

Perlis

Selangor

Terengganu

State and Settlement Councils

Notes

References
Barbara Watson Andaya dan Leonard Y. Andaya. A History of Malaysia, The MacMlllan Press Ltd. (1982). .
The World Book Encyclopedia, World Book International (1994). .

Malaya
General elections in Malaysia
General
Political history of Malaya